The 2016–17 Air Force Falcons men's ice hockey season was the 49th season of play for the program and the 11th season in the Atlantic Hockey conference. The Falcons represented the United States Air Force Academy and were coached by Frank Serratore, in his 20th season.

Season
Air Force began the season as one of the four teams selected to participate in the Ice Breaker Tournament. In a surprising turn of events, the Falcons upset pre-season #5 Boston College behind the standout performance by Shane Starrett. The sophomore netminder faced an onslaught in the championship and turned aside 46 shots to earn a tie. A single-elimination shootout was used to determine the champion and, after Starrett stopped Ohio State's Nick Schilkey, Tyler Ledford scored to secure the title for Air Force. The stunning result contributed to Air Force earning a top-20 ranking the following week, but their position in the polls was short lived as they split the following weekend with Arizona State. The Falcons went through a rough patch in the first half of the year, losing nearly as many games as they won.

The Falcons returned after the winter break with a much more concerted defensive effort and ran a winning streak to 6 games. After dropping a weekend to Canisius in mid-January, Air Force won 9 of their next 11 games. The extended period of success allowed the Falcons to regain a spot in the polls and gave them a chance at winning the Atlantic Hockey title. Entering the final weekend of the regular season, they needed four points to get past Canisius or three to split the regular season title. The Falcons blew out Canisius 5–0 in the first game, leaving them one point behind the Griffins. While they were hoping for a repeat performance in the season finale, the Pioneer netminder, Nathan Perry, stopped 39 Falcon shots. That still left Air Force in the lead by a 2–1 score with about a minute to play. After pulling their goaltender, SHU managed to tie the game with 53 seconds left. In the overtime, Air Force was given a gift when Sacred Heart took a penalty at the 50 second mark. The Falcons were unable to get on track during the power play and failed to record a shot on goal. Instead, the Pioneers were able to get Starrett to take an unsportsmanlike penalty and even the playing field. Just 4 seconds after the ensuing faceoff, the puck found its way into the Air Force net and the Falcons were relegated to 2nd-place.

Conference tournament
Air Force still earned a bye into their conference quarterfinal round, but they were still on the bubble for the NCAA Tournament. While it was possible that they could make the bracket without a conference championship, it was unlikely even with their outstanding record. The team could ill afford a bad loss now and they took care of business against Bentley. While they had to overcome a 5-minute penalty in the second game, Air Force surrendered just a single goal in the two games and advanced to the semifinal. 

They got a tough fight from Army and the two rivals were evenly-matched for most of the contest, but Starrett recorded his second shutout of the tournament and the Falcons moved on to the championship. The team played one of its worst games all-season, recording just 14 shots on goal, but still managed to find the twine on two occasions. The Falcons rode a brilliant performance by Starrett to a championship and earned a trip to the national tournament.

NCAA tournament
Normally, the Atlantic Hockey champion received a 4th seed for the NCAA tournament. Air Force, with its 26 wins and top-15 ranking, was afforded a 3rd seed, becoming just the second entry from its conference to be given that high of a ranking. They opened the tournament against Western Michigan, who they had already played during the season, and took over the game for the first 44 minutes. The Falcons outshout the Broncos 25–13 entering the third and had a 3–1 lead. Phil Boje netted a power play marker just before the 4-minute mark and it appeared that the Falcons were going to fly to an easy victory. Western Michigan, however, fought back hard and scored twice in the next 75 seconds to cut the lead to 1. Tyler Ledford gave the team a 2-goal cushion less than 90 seconds later but WMU continued to attack. After pulling their goalie, Western Michigan made the score 5–4 with just under 2 minutes to play and all the momentum in their favor. The pressure was eased, however, when Wade Allison took a major penalty at 18:47. Air Force was able to hold off the Broncos and advance to the regional final. 

For the Falcons' second game, the script was flipped and the team found itself down by 3 goals at the midway point of the game. However, just over a minute after Harvard's third goal, Michael Floodstrand tripped a Falcon. Air Force got possession of the puck on the delayed penalty and managed to finally solve Merrick Madsen. Because NCAA rules did not wipe out a penalty if a team scored prior to the ensuing whistle, Air Force still got a power play out of the infraction and scored 15 seconds into their advantage. This left the team down by just a single goal with over 28 minutes to play. Unfortunately, Harvard's defense closed ranks and the team played nearly error-free hockey for the rest of the game. The Falcons were able to get several shots on goal, but could get no more to find the back of the net and the team was eliminated.

After the season, Shane Starrett was able to parlay his stellar campaign into a professional contract. He became the first Air Force player to sign with an NHL team when he inked a two-year deal with the Edmonton Oilers.

Departures

Recruiting

Roster

Standings

Schedule and results

|-
!colspan=12 style=";" | Exhibition

|-
!colspan=12 style=";" | 

|-
!colspan=12 style=";" | Regular Season

|-
!colspan=12 style=";" | 

|- align="center" bgcolor="#e0e0e0"
|colspan=12|Air Force Won Series 2–0

|-
!colspan=12 style=";" |

Scoring statistics

Goaltending statistics

Rankings

USCHO did not release a poll in Week 24.

Awards and honors

References

Air Force Falcons men's ice hockey seasons
Air Force Falcons
Air Force Falcons
Air Force Falcons
Air Force Falcons